Al-Mu'jam al-Awsat, is one of the famous Hadith books written by great Hadith Narrator Imam Al-Tabarani (874–971 CE, 260–360 AH).

Description
The book contains almost 9500 hadiths according to Maktaba Shamila. It is one of the major book of Hadith written by Imam Tabarani beside his other books. The book contains Sahih (authentic), Da'if (weak) and Maud'o (fabricated) narrations.

Publications
The book has been published in various languages by many organizations around the world: 
   al-Mu`jam al-awsat 
    Mu'jam al-Awsat (7 vol) المعجم الأوسط للطبراني: Published: DKI, Beirut, 2012 (Beirut, Lebanon)
   Urdu: Al-Mujam Al-Awsat Arabic - Urdu (7 Volumes Full Set). By Imam Tabrani: Published: Non, Darussalam

See also
 List of Sunni books
 Kutub al-Sittah
 Sahih Muslim
 Jami al-Tirmidhi
 Sunan Abu Dawood
 Jami' at-Tirmidhi
 Either: Sunan ibn Majah, Muwatta Malik

References

9th-century Arabic books
10th-century Arabic books
Sunni literature
Hadith
Hadith collections
Sunni hadith collections